Several ships of the Royal Navy have borne the name Delft:
 , captured in 1665 during the Battle of Lowestoft. She was sold in 1668.
 , formerly the Dutch ship Hercules captured in 1797 during the Battle of Camperdown. She was sunk as a breakwater in 1822. Because Delft served in the navy's Egyptian campaign between 8 March 1801 and 2 September, her officers and crew qualified for the clasp "Egypt" to the Naval General Service Medal, which the Admiralty issued in 1847 to all surviving claimants.

Sources

References
 

Royal Navy ship names